Coolangatta & Tweed Heads Golf Club is a golf club in Australia. It is located in Tweed Heads, New South Wales. It was formed in 1932. It has hosted several notable golf tournaments including the Queensland Open and Gold Coast Classic.

History 
On 12 June 1926 a group of people met at Coolangatta Town Hall in Coolangatta, Queensland to advocate the construction of a new golf course. The following year a decision was made to create the golf course. In 1928 construction began however immediately there were difficulties. By 1930 a new, final site was chosen. Within two years the first nine holes were complete and the golf club opened on 4 December 1932. In 1951 the second nine holes were completed. In 1974 and 1981 additional nine holes sets were added. Currently the club consists of 101 hectares. It also consists of a large wildlife reserve.

The golf club has hosted a number of notable golf tournaments. On 24 May 1978 it was announced that the course would host the Gold Coast Professional Gold Classic. It was an event on the PGA Tour of Australia. The event was played from 1978 to 1983. Notable champions include Gary Player, Payne Stewart, and Graham Marsh. In 1986 the club hosted the Queensland Open. The tournament was won by Greg Norman. It currently hosts the Twin Towns Open.

Club professionals 
As of 1954, Reginald Want was the club professional. Want won the Queensland Open earlier in the year. In January 1980 Geoff Parslow became the club professional.

Tournaments hosted 

 1986 Queensland Open
 1983 Gold Coast Classic
 1982 Gold Coast Classic
 1981 Gold Coast Classic
 1980 Gold Coast Classic
 1979 Gold Coast Classic
 1978 Gold Coast Classic

References

External links
 

1932 establishments in Australia
Sports clubs established in 1932
Golf clubs and courses in New South Wales
Golf clubs and courses in Queensland
Sport on the Gold Coast, Queensland
Sport in Tweed Heads, New South Wales
Coolangatta